Diflomotecan (also known as BN80905) is a chemotherapeutic agent that is a topoisomerase inhibitor (Top1).  It varies from other camptothecin based Top1 inhibitors like topotecan in having a 7-membered E-ring. The oxepan-2-one ring in the homocamptothecin analogues is more stable in plasma compared to the 6-membered lactone in camptothecin. Diflomotecan was the first homocamptothecin to enter clinical trials and is currently in phase I for treating patients with sensitive small cell lung cancer (SCLC).

References

Epsilon-lactones
Topoisomerase inhibitors